Melissa Bell may refer to:

Melissa Bell (singer) (1964–2017), British lead singer of Soul II Soul
Melissa Bell (actor) (born 1972), Australian soap opera actress
Melissa Bell (journalist), publisher of Vox Media